This list of roads in Metro Manila summarizes the major thoroughfares and the numbering system currently being implemented in Metro Manila, Philippines.

Metro Manila's major road network comprises six circumferential roads and ten radial roads connecting the cities of Caloocan, Las Piñas, Makati, Malabon, Mandaluyong, Manila, Marikina, Muntinlupa, Navotas, Parañaque, Pasay, Pasig, Quezon City, San Juan, Taguig, and Valenzuela, and the municipality of Pateros.

Route classification 
This list only covers roads that are listed as National Primary, National Secondary, or National Tertiary Roads on the Department of Public Works and Highways's Infrastructure Atlas, as well as the previous Circumferential and Radial Road system prior to 2014. These road classifications are defined as follows:
 National Primary Roads – Contiguous road sections extending that connect major cities. Primary roads make up the main trunk line or backbone of the National Road System.
 National Secondary Roads – Roads that directly connect major ports, major ferry terminals, major airports, tourist service centers, and major government infrastructure to National Primary Roads.

Both Primary and Secondary roads may be named as Bypass Roads or Diversion Roads, which divert pass-through traffic away from city or municipality business centers with affirmative feasibility studies, or roads that would connect or fill the gap between adjoining National roads.

 National Tertiary Roads – Other existing roads under the Department of Public Works and Highways that perform a local function.

Any roads not classified as National Primary, National Secondary, or National Tertiary may be classified as follows:

 Expressways – Limited-access roads, normally with interchanges that may include facilities for levying tolls for passage in an open or closed system.
 Provincial Roads – Roads that connect barangays through rural areas, major provincial government infrastructure, and/or cities and municipalities without traversing any National Roads.
 Municipal and City Roads – Roads within a poblacion or roads that connect Provincial and National Roads or provide inter-barangay connections to major Municipal and City Infrastructure without traversing Provincial Roads
 Barangay Roads – Any other public roads within a barangay not covered by other classifications.

Numbered routes

Circumferential and radial roads 

The first road numbering system in the Philippines was adapted in 1940 by the administration of President Manuel Quezon, and was very much similar to U.S. Highway numbering system. Portions of it are 70 roads labeled Highway 1 to Highway 60. Some parts of the numbering system are Admiral Dewey Boulevard (Highway 1), Calle Manila (Highway 50) and 19 de Junio (Highway 54).

In 1945, the Metropolitan Thoroughfare Plan was submitted by Quezon City planners Louis Croft and Antonio Kayanan which proposed the laying of 10 radial roads, which purposes in conveying traffic in and out of the city of Manila to the surrounding cities and provinces, and the completion of six Circumferential Roads, that will act as beltways of the city, forming altogether a web-like arterial road system. The Department of Public Works and Highways (DPWH) is the government agency that deals with these projects.

The road numbering for radial roads are R-1 up to R-10. The radial roads never intersect one another and they do not intersect circumferential roads twice; hence they continue straight routes leading out from the city of Manila to the provinces. The numbering is arranged in a counter-clockwise pattern, wherein the southernmost is R-1 and the northernmost is R-10. Circumferential roads are numbered C-1 to C-6, the innermost beltway is C-1, while the outermost is C-6.

Radial roads 
There are ten radial roads that serves the purpose of conveying traffic in and out of the city of Manila to the surrounding cities of the metropolis and to the provinces, numbered in a counter clockwise pattern. All radial roads starts at Kilometer Zero, demarked by a marble marcos across the Rizal Monument in Rizal Park along Roxas Boulevard.

Circumferential roads 
There are six circumferential roads around the City of Manila that acts as beltways for the city. The first two runs inside the Manila city proper, while the next three runs outside the City of Manila. Another circumferential road, the C-6, will run outside Metro Manila and is under construction.

Highway network 

The radial and circumferential road numbers are being supplanted by a new highway number system, which the Department of Public Works and Highways have laid out in 2014. The new system classifies the national roads or highways as national primary roads, national secondary roads, and national tertiary roads. Primary national roads are numbered with one to two-digit numbers. Secondary national roads are assigned three-digit numbers, with the first digit being the number of the principal national road of the region. Secondary national roads around Manila mostly connect to N1 and are numbered with 100-series numbers.

Expressway network 

Expressways are assigned with numbers with an E prefix to avoid confusion with numbered national roads. Expressways are limited-access roads, with crossing traffic limited to overpasses, underpasses, and interchanges. Some existing expressways serving Metro Manila also form part of the latter's arterial road network (see the list above).

Other major roads
Many other streets in the metropolis are considered major roads. Only Dr. Arcadio Santos Avenue (Sucat Road or N63) is designated a primary national road that is not part of the arterial road system. Roads with 3-number designations are secondary national roads.

This list only covers roads that are listed as National Primary, National Secondary, or National Tertiary Roads on the Department of Public Works and Highways's Infrastructure Atlas.

Capital District

Eastern Manila District

Mandaluyong

Marikina
 Andres Bonifacio Avenue
 Bayan-Bayanan Avenue
 FVR Road/C-5 Road, known as C5-Riverbanks Access Road
 General Ordoñez Street
 Gil Fernando Avenue
 Jose P. Rizal Street
 Marikina–Infanta Highway/R-6 Road, known as Marcos Highway
 Shoe Avenue
 Sumulong Highway

Pasig

Quezon City

 Amoranto Street (formerly called Retiro; Gregorio Araneta Avenue to Maceda Street)
 Balete Drive (New Manila neighborhood of Quezon City)
 Banawe Street (Santa Mesa Heights neighborhood of Quezon City)
 Batasan Road (Batasan Hills, Quezon City)
 Batasan-San Mateo Road (Batasan Road in Quezon City to San Mateo, Rizal)
 Broadway Avenue – (formerly Doña Juana Rodriguez; New Manila neighborhood of Quezon City)
 Bonny Serrano Avenue (formerly called Santolan Road; Katipunan Avenue to Ortigas Avenue) – N185
 D. Tuazon Street (Sgt. Rivera to E. Rodriguez Sr. Avenue in Quezon City)
 Del Monte Avenue (San Francisco del Monte neighborhood of Quezon City)
 Don A. Roces Avenue (Quezon Avenue to Tomas Morato in Quezon City)
 Doña Hemady Avenue (N. Domingo to E. Rodriguez, Sr. Ave.; New Manila neighborhood of Quezon City)
 East Avenue (Diliman neighborhood of Quezon City) – N174
 Eulogio Rodriguez Sr. Avenue (Welcome Rotunda to Cubao District of Quezon City)
 General Luis Street (Novaliches) - N118
 Gilmore Avenue (New Manila neighborhood of Quezon City)
 Greenmeadows Avenue (C5 to Ortigas Avenue)
 Kalayaan Avenue (Elliptical Road to Kamuning Road)
 Kamias Road (EDSA to Kalayaan Avenue)
 Mayon Avenue (La Loma neighborhood of Quezon City)
 Mindanao Avenue (Regalado to Commonwealth Avenue; not to be confused with Mindanao Avenue of C-5 Road)
 North Avenue (Project 6 neighborhood of Quezon City) – N173
 Regalado Avenue (North Fairview District)
 Regalado Highway (Commonwealth Avenue to Quirino Highway in Fairview District, Quezon City)
 Roosevelt Avenue (Quezon Avenue to EDSA in Quezon City)
 Susano Road (Novaliches)
 Timog Avenue (Barangay Laging Handa of Quezon City; Timog is Tagalog for "south") – N172
 Times Street (Barangay West Triangle; exclusive neighborhood of Quezon City)
 Tomas Morato Avenue (ABS-CBN Compound in Barangay South Triangle to E. Rodriguez, Sr. Avenue in Quezon City)
 Visayas Avenue (Quezon Memorial Circle to Tandang Sora Avenue in Quezon City)
 West Avenue (Project 7 neighborhood of Quezon City) – N171
 White Plains Avenue (Temple Drive to EDSA)
 Zabarte Road (Quirino Highway to Caloocan)

San Juan

Northern Manila District (Camanava)

Caloocan

South Caloocan
 5th Avenue – N130
 10th Avenue
 A. Mabini Street
 Samson Road – N120
North Caloocan
 Camarin Road
 Deparo Road
 Susano Road
 Zabarte Road

Malabon
 Governor Pascual Avenue
 Paterio Aquino Avenue

Navotas
 North Bay Boulevard

Valenzuela
 General Luis Street - N118
 Maysan Road – N118

Southern Manila District

Las Piñas

 Alabang–Zapote Road – N411
 CAA Road
 Daang Hari Road (Las Piñas-Bacoor in Cavite)
 Diego Cera Avenue
 J. Aguilar Avenue (CAA-BF International, Las Piñas)
 Marcos Alvarez Avenue (Talon district of Las Piñas, Molino district of Bacoor, Cavite)
 Naga Road (Pulanglupa district of Las Piñas)

Makati

Muntinlupa

Parañaque

 Aseana Avenue
 Dr. Santos Avenue or Sucat Road (Sucat district of Parañaque) – N63
 Doña Soledad Avenue
 Elpidio Quirino Avenue
 NAIA Expressway – E6
 Ninoy Aquino Avenue – N63
 Pacific Avenue

Pasay

 Andrews Avenue (includes Airport and Sales Roads; Roxas Boulevard to SLEX in Pasay-Taguig boundary in front of Terminal 3) – N192
 Arnaiz Avenue "formerly called Libertad Street/Pasay Road"
 Domestic Road – in front of Domestic Terminal (Airport Road or Andrews Avenue to NAIA Road in Pasay) – N193
 Harrison Avenue
 Macapagal Boulevard – The major road in Bay City (Gil Puyat Avenue in Pasay to Pacific Avenue in Parañaque)
 Jose W. Diokno Boulevard – The main major highway along Manila Bay and SM Mall of Asia that serves as the freer and seaside route to the Macapagal Boulevard
 NAIA Expressway
 NAIA Road (Diosdado Macapagal Boulevard to NAIA – 2 in Pasay) – N63 and N194
 Ninoy Aquino Avenue – Location of NAIA – 1 (NAIA Road in Pasay to Dr. Santos Avenue in Parañaque) – N63
 Tramo Street (Andrews Avenue to EDSA)

Pateros
 B. Morcilla Street (Pateros town proper)
 Jose P. Rizal Avenue Extension (also Guadalupe-Pateros Road, going to Guadalupe Nuevo in Makati)
 M. Almeda Street (Gen. Luna Street in Taguig to R. Jabson Street in Pasig)
 P. Rosales Street (going to Tipas area in Taguig)

Taguig

 5th Avenue (Bonifacio Global City)
 8th Avenue (Bonifacio Global City)
 11th Avenue (Bonifacio Global City)
 26th Street (Bonifacio Global City)
 32nd Street (Bonifacio Global City)
 38th Street (Bonifacio Global City)
 Arca Boulevard (Arca South)
 Bagong Calzada Street
 Bayani Road
 Cayetano Boulevard
 Carlos P. Garcia Avenue/C-5
 General Luna Street
 General Santos Avenue
 Lawton Avenue
 Le Grande Avenue (Bonifacio Global City/McKinley West)
 McKinley Parkway (Bonifacio Global City)
 McKinley Road (Bonifacio Global City to Makati)
 Maria Rodriguez Tinga Avenue
 Manuel L. Quezon Street
 South Luzon Expressway
 University Parkway (Bonifacio Global City)
 Upper McKinley Road (Bonifacio Capital District)

See also

Road numbering
List of eponymous streets in Metro Manila
List of renamed streets in Metro Manila
List of expressways in the Philippines
Highways in the Philippines

References

 
Roads